Livingston Mall is a two-level shopping mall located in Livingston, New Jersey, United States, serving western Essex, Morris and Union counties. As of 2022, Livingston Mall currently features the tenants Macy's, and Barnes & Noble and retailers such as American Eagle, Hollister, H&M, and Victoria's Secret.

History
Livingston Mall was planned in the late 1960s and opened for business in stages starting with Bamberger's in 1971, followed by the mall proper itself in 1972 along with additional anchor stores, Sears, M. Epstein, and Hahne & Company in 1972. The mall benefited from the migration of population in Northern New Jersey to suburban and exurban areas, and the exodus of shoppers and stores from downtown Newark, once Northern New Jersey's premiere shopping mecca that was in serious decline since the July 1967 race riots. Both Bamberger's and Hahne & Co. had massive flagship stores in downtown Newark at the time of the mall opening.  Sears also had a store on Elizabeth Avenue in Newark's once popular South Ward. In 1986, the Bamberger's store transformed into Macy's. In 1985, Hahne's gave way to Lord & Taylor when its parent company, which owned both banners, decided to retire the Hahne's brand.  Around this time the M. Epstein store was converted to an annex for Macy's.

The early 2020's saw multiple classic chain anchors retreat from brick and mortar after being disrupted by digital retailers in recent years. On February 6, 2020, it was announced that Sears will shutter. On August 27, 2020, it was announced that retailer Lord & Taylor would close its location at the mall.

A plan for the 50-year-old Livingston Mall to be refreshed was authorized by the Livingston Township in March 2021.

Location
Livingston Mall is located at the intersection of Eisenhower Parkway and South Orange Avenue, and is accessible from Exit 4A off Interstate 280, New Jersey Route 10, New Jersey Route 24, Interstate 78, and Interstate 287. Bus service is provided by NJ Transit's 70, 73, and 873 routes. Coach USA's Community Coach 77 bus also serves the mall. The Township of Livingston operates the Livingston Express Shuttle which serves the mall and the South Orange station.

References

External links
 Official website
 International Council of Shopping Centers: Livingston Mall, accessed September 21, 2006

Buildings and structures in Essex County, New Jersey
Livingston, New Jersey
Shopping malls established in 1972
Shopping malls in New Jersey
Tourist attractions in Essex County, New Jersey
Shopping malls in the New York metropolitan area
Kohan Retail Investment Group